The 2001 The Citadel Bulldogs football team represented The Citadel, The Military College of South Carolina in the 2001 NCAA Division I-AA football season.  Ellis Johnson served as head coach for the first season.  The Bulldogs played as members of the Southern Conference and played home games at Johnson Hagood Stadium.

Schedule
The Bulldogs game against Western Carolina was rescheduled from September 15 to November 17 due to the September 11, 2001 attacks.

References

Citadel Bulldogs
The Citadel Bulldogs football seasons
Citadel football